The Hamina-class missile boat is a class of fast attack craft of the Finnish Navy. They are classified as "missile fast attack craft" or ohjusvene, literally "missile boat" in Finnish.
The Hamina FACs are based at Upinniemi, and form the 7th Surface Warfare Squadron, part of the Finnish Coastal Fleet, together with the minelayers MLC Hämeenmaa, Porkkala and Pyhäranta.

History

The vessels were built in the late 1990s, early 2000s, and are the fourth generation of Finnish missile craft. The first vessel was ordered in December 1996 and the fourth was handed over on 19 June 2006. Since the launch of the s, all fast attack craft have been named after Finnish coastal cities.

The four vessels form what the Finnish Navy calls Squadron 2000. Initially the Finnish Navy considered several different compositions for the new squadron, and at one point only two Hamina-class vessels and four  ACV were to have been built. After a strategic shift of the Finnish Navy's role, the composition of the Squadron 2000 followed suit. The Tuuli-class prototype was never fully equipped, nor fitted for operational use and its three sisters were cancelled, instead two more Hamina-class boats have been built; with some of the equipment intended for the Tuulis being used in the Haminas. The fourth and final Hamina-class vessel was delivered in summer 2006.

The squadron reached its full operational capability in 2008 and have greatly improved the surface- and air surveillance  as well as air defense capability of the Finnish Navy. Their electronic surveillance suite also increases the quality of information available to military leaders.

All ships were built at Rauma shipyard by Aker Finnyards in Rauma, Finland. The vessels have their home base at Upinniemi.

In March 2014 it was announced that the Hamina-class missile boats will be upgraded in the near future.

MLU (Mid-Life Update)

Modernization of the four Hamina-class ships began in 2018 and was completed in April 2022, The MLU programme will enable the Haminas to continue their service into the mid 2030's.

The main gun armament is being changed from 57mm to 40mm in order to save weight. The vessels were already at maximum weight and in order to introduce torpedoes this had to be changed.

Design
The vessel's hull is constructed of aluminum and the superstructures are constructed of reinforced carbon fiber composite. The vessels have a very low displacement and are very maneuverable. They are equipped with water jets instead of propellers, which allow them to operate in very shallow waters and accelerate, slow down and turn in unconventional ways.

The Hamina class are very potent vessels, boasting surveillance and firepower capacities which are usually found in ships twice the size.

Stealth technology 

The Hamina class has been designed and constructed as stealth ships with minimal magnetic, heat and radar signatures.

The shape of the vessel has been designed to reduce radar signature. Metal parts have been covered with radar absorbent material, and the composite parts have radar absorbent material embedded in the structure. Radar transparent materials have been used where applicable.

Unlike glass fiber, carbon fiber blocks radio waves. This protects ship's electronics against electromagnetic pulse. In addition, it stops any radio frequency signals generated by ships electronic devices escaping outside.
Except for the bridge, the vessel has no windows that would allow the signals to escape.

The vessel contains hardly any steel parts, thus generating very low magnetic field. The remaining magnetic field is actively canceled with electromagnets.

Exhaust gases can be directed underwater to minimize thermal signature, or up in the air to minimize sound in submarines direction.
50 nozzles around the decks and upper structures can be used to spray seawater on the vessel to cool it.
In addition, the nozzles can be used to clean the ship after chemical attack or radioactive fall-out.

Weapons 
The Hamina class have the latest in surveillance and weapons technology all integrated into an intelligent command system.

The Hamina class' primary weaponry is four RBS-15 Mk.3 anti-ship missiles. The vessels are further equipped with a Bofors 57 mm gun against surface and aerial targets as well as the Umkhonto-IR surface-to-air missiles, MASS decoy system and two 12.7 mm heavy machine guns. It is also possible to use the ships for mine-laying.

The software of the centralized combat control system is COTS oriented, built on top of Linux running on redundant x86 rack servers, which makes maintenance and future updates and optimizations simpler.

In early 2018, Finland announced the mid-life upgrade program, which will equip all four boats in the class with new Swedish lightweight anti-submarine warfare torpedoes in the years 2023−2025 and extend the life of the boats to 2035.

Vessels 
FNS Hamina
Pennant number: 80
Builder: Aker Finnyards
Ordered: December 1996
Commissioned: 24 August 1998
Home base: Upinniemi
Current status: In active service.
FNS Tornio

Pennant number: 81
Builder: Aker Finnyards
Ordered: 15 February 2001
Commissioned: 12 May 2003
Home base: Upinniemi
Current status: In active service
FNS Hanko
Pennant number: 82
Builder: Aker Finnyards
Ordered: 3 December 2003
Commissioned: 22 June 2005
Home base: Upinniemi
Current status: In active service

FNS Pori
Pennant number: 83
Builder: Aker Finnyards
Ordered: 15 February 2005
Commissioned: 19 June 2006
Home base: Upinniemi
Current status: In active service

Similar ships

References

Further reading
 Domonyi, H: "Hamina-luokan ohjusvene Tornio: Tekniikan lippulaiva", Tekniikan Maailma 18/2006

|

Missile boat classes
Missile boats of the Finnish Navy
Ships built in Finland